The Borgarsyssel Museum is a museum located at Sarpsborg in Viken county, Norway. The museum was named after Borgarsysla, the Old Norse name of Østfold county.

It was founded in 1921 and documents Østfold's cultural history from the Middle Ages. The open-air collection includes about twenty historic buildings. It is located at the site of the ruins of the Medieval St. Nicholas's Church, which was built during the reign of King Øystein (1103–1123). 
Olaf's Chapel was built at the Borgarsyssel Museum as an exhibition hall for the Saint Olaf Jubilee (Olavsjubileet) in 1930.

Since 1947, the Borgarsyssel Museum has been the main county museum of Østfold. Since 1 January 2006 it has been a part of the Østfold Museum (Østfoldmuseet), which coordinates all museums in the county.

Gallery

References

External links

Ostfoldmusee Official site

Local museums in Norway
Buildings and structures in Sarpsborg
Museums in Viken
Museums established in 1921
1921 establishments in Norway
Open-air museums in Norway